Levoamphetamine{{#tag:ref|Synonyms and alternate spellings include:  (IUPAC name), levamfetamine (International Nonproprietary Name [INN]), and  is a central nervous system (CNS) stimulant known to increase wakefulness and concentration in association with decreased appetite and fatigue. Pharmaceuticals that contain levoamphetamine are currently indicated and prescribed for the treatment of attention deficit hyperactivity disorder (ADHD), obesity, and narcolepsy in some countries.

Levoamphetamine is the levorotatory stereoisomer of the amphetamine molecule. While pharmaceutical formulations containing enantiopure levoamphetamine are no longer manufactured, levomethamphetamine (levmetamfetamine) is still marketed and sold over-the-counter as a nasal decongestant.

Chemistry 

Levoamphetamine is the levorotatory stereoisomer of the amphetamine molecule. Racemic amphetamine contains two optical isomers, dextroamphetamine, and levoamphetamine.

Formulations

Racemic amphetamine 

The first patented amphetamine brand, Benzedrine, was a racemic (i.e., equal parts) mixture of the free bases or sulfate salts of both amphetamine enantiomers (levoamphetamine and dextroamphetamine) that was introduced in the United States in 1934 as an inhaler for treating nasal congestion. It was later realized that the amphetamine enantiomers could treat obesity, narcolepsy, and ADHD. Because of the greater central nervous system effect of the dextrorotatory enantiomer (i.e., dextroamphetamine), sold as Dexedrine, prescription of the Benzedrine brand fell and was eventually discontinued. However, in 2012, racemic amphetamine sulfate was reintroduced as the Evekeo brandname.

Adderall 
Adderall is a 3.1:1 mixture of dextro- to levo- amphetamine base equivalent pharmaceutical that contains equal amounts (by weight) of four salts: dextroamphetamine sulfate, amphetamine sulfate, dextroamphetamine saccharate and amphetamine (D,L)-aspartate monohydrate.

Evekeo 
Evekeo is an FDA-approved medication that contains racemic amphetamine sulfate (i.e., 50% levoamphetamine sulfate and 50% dextroamphetamine sulfate). It is approved for the treatment of narcolepsy, ADHD, and exogenous obesity. The orally disintegrating tablets are approved for the treatment of attention deficit hyperactivity disorder (ADHD) in children and adolescents aged six to 17 years of age.

Others 
Products using amphetamine base are now marketed. Dyanavel XR, a liquid suspension form became available in 2015, and contains about 24% levoamphetamine. Adzenys XR, an orally dissolving tablet came to market in 2016 and contains 25% levoamphetamine.

Enantiopure levoamphetamine succinate was sold in Hungary between 1952 and 1955 under the brand name Cydril.

See also 
 Levomethamphetamine

Notes

References

External links
 
 
 
 
 

Amphetamine
Drugs acting on the cardiovascular system
Drugs acting on the nervous system
Enantiopure drugs
Norepinephrine-dopamine releasing agents
Stimulants
Substituted amphetamines
TAAR1 agonists
VMAT inhibitors